The Turkish Rugby Federation is the governing body for rugby union in Turkey. It was founded in 2011, and became affiliated to Rugby Europe in 2012. Turkey became an associate member of World Rugby in 2020. Turkish Rugby Federation also governs American football, baseball and softball activities in Turkey.

Teams
Turkey - the national men's rugby union team.
rugby union / 7s / sevens - the national men's rugby union seven-a-side team.
Turkey national rugby league team
Turkey women's national rugby union team

References

External links
Turkish Rugby Federation - Official Site

Rugby union in Turkey
Turkey
Sports organizations established in 2011